Reimers is a surname. Notable people with the surname include:

 Bruce Reimers (born 1960), former American football guard 
 Dieter Reimers (born 1943), German astronomer and director of the Hamburg Observatory, who gave his name to 6163 Reimers, an inner main-belt asteroid
 Ed Reimers (Edwin W. Reimers, 1912–2009) American actor 
 Egill Reimers (1878–1946), Norwegian architect and sailor
 Eigil Reimers (1904-1976), Danish actor 
 Fernando Reimers, American professor 
 Herman Johan Foss Reimers (1843–1928), Norwegian judge and politician 
 Karoline Bjørnson (née Reimers, 1835–1934) Norwegian actress 
 Knud Reimers (1906-1987), Danish-born Scandinavian yacht designer 
 Kyle Reimers (born 1989), former Australian rules footballer
 Nicolaus Reimers (1551–1600), Reimarus Ursus, Nicolaus Reimers Bär or Nicolaus Reymers Baer, astronomer and imperial mathematician to Emperor Rudolf II
 Pablo Reimers Morales (1946–20140, Mexican entrepreneur 
 Paula Reimers, American rabbi
 Sophie Reimers (1853–1932), Norwegian stage actress
 Susan Reimers (1973-present), aka S. Viola, American author
 Ulrich Reimers (born 1952), German electrical engineer

See also
 Reimer, a name
 Riemer, a name
 Remer (disambiguation)

Surnames